De remediis utriusque fortunae ("Remedies for Fortunes") is a collection of 254 Latin dialogues written by the humanist Francesco Petrarca (1304–1374), commonly known as Petrarch.

The dialogues display remarkably lucid ideas that are cogently expressed. Drawing on classical sources, Petrarch expounded on refinement in taste and intellect, on finesse and propriety in speech and style.

The writing is a bouquet of moral philosophy, set out to show how thought and deed can generate happiness on the one hand, or sorrow and disillusionment on the other. In a recurring theme throughout the dialogues, Petrarch advises humility in prosperity and fortitude in adversity.

The dialogue is a development of a type seen in Seneca’s De remediis fortuitorum.

The 254 woodcut illustrations by the anonymous Master of Petrarch for the 1532 German edition are considered masterpieces of the German Renaissance.

In 1579, the dialogues were translated into English by the Elizabethan physician Thomas Twyne (1543–1613) as Phisicke Against Fortune, and by Susannah Dobson in 1791 as Petrarch's View of Human Life.

References

External links

 Petrarch's View of Human Life, Susannah Dobson's translation
De remediis utriusque fortunae, Cremonae, B. de Misintis ac Caesaris Parmensis, 1492. Online at Wikisource 
„Von der Artzney bayder Glück / des guoten vnd widerwertigen. Vnnd weß sich ain yeder inn Gelück vnnd vnglück halten sol. Auß dem Lateinischen in das Teütsch gezogen. Mit künstlichen fyguren durchauß / gantz lustig vnd schön gezyeret.“ Augsburg: Heynrich Steyner 1532. Online at gallica
Catharina Ypes: Petrarca in de Nederlandse letterkunde. De Spieghel, Amsterdam 1934. Online at Digitale Bibliotheek voor de Nederlandse Letteren

Medieval literature
Petrarch